The Naisten Liiga All-Star teams honor the best performers at each position over the Naisten Liiga season and have been recognized since the 2006–07 season. Teams are selected by the Finnish Ice Hockey Association following the end of the regular season.

The career leader in selections is centre Linda Leppänen, named to a total of eight all-star teams, four while playing with Ilves Naiset and four with Espoo Blues Naiset (Espoo United Naiset). Jenni Hiirikoski leads all defensemen in selections, with six, and Anni Keisala leads all goaltenders in selections, with four. Of players active in the league, left winger Elisa Holopainen leads with five selections.

French centre Estelle Duvin was the first international player to be honored as a first team all-star, selected for the 2020–21 season. Czech centre Michaela Pejzlová and French defenseman Athéna Locatelli were the first international players to be honored as second team all-stars, also for the 2020–21 season.

All-Stars

Most selections 
The following table only lists players with at least three total selections.

References 
 
 
 

All-Star